Vladimir Ivanovich Lakeev (born in 1949) is a Russian Communist politician. He was the First Secretary of the Central Committee of the United Communist Party in Russia.

Political activity 
Since 1984 Lakeev was at the CPSU party work: as an instructor, deputy head and head of the ideological department of the Kirov district committee of the CPSU in Moscow.

Since 1991 Lakeev was a member of the resistance movement against the bourgeois counter-revolution, one of the leaders of the Moscow Committee of the Russian Communist Workers' Party, a member of the political council of the movement "Working Russia". Since 1994 he was a secretary, and since 2000 he was the second secretary of the Moscow City Committee of the Communist Party of the Russian Federation (CPRF).

He was a Deputy of the Moscow City Duma of the fourth convocation where he headed the Communist Party faction.

He was expelled from the CPRF in 2010, during the so-called "Moscow's case". In 2010-2014 Lakeev was the first secretary of the Moscow City Committee of the alternative Communist Party.

At the organizational plenum of the Central Committee of the United Communist Party on 15 March 2014 Lakeev was elected the First Secretary of the Party Central Committee.

Lakeev is the Chairman of the Interregional Association of Communists (IAC).

References 

Russian Marxists
Living people
Russian communists
1949 births